WBBZ (1230 kHz, "Newstalk 1230") is an AM radio station licensed to Ponca City, Oklahoma. The station broadcasts an news/talk format and is owned by Sterling Broadcasting, LLC.

History
Federal Communications Commission (FCC) records list WBBZ's "Date First Licensed" as September 9, 1925. However, due to the station's complicated history, there are alternate chronologies that trace its founding to both early 1924, and January 1928.

In early 1924 Noble B. Watson in Indianapolis, Indiana, was issued a license for a new station with the sequentially assigned call letters WBBZ. Nobel ceased operating the station in May 1925, and the Department of Commerce, regulators of radio at the time, reported that the station had been deleted. However, Noble sold the station equipment to C. L. Carrell of Chicago, Illinois, who on September 9, 1925 received a new station license that retained the WBBZ call letters.

 
Carrell outfitted WBBZ as a portable broadcasting station, joining what would eventually be a roster of seven stations that he controlled. These stations were generally hired out for a few weeks at a time to theaters, mostly located in small midwestern towns that didn't have their own radio stations, to be used for special programs broadcast to the local community. WBBZ reportedly made its first Ponca City appearance sometime in 1927, when Carrell associate Harry Kyler brought the station to town for a week-long run at the Poncan Theatre. The station later returned for a longer stay at the Theatre, beginning with a broadcast at 7:00 p.m. on January 30, 1928.

In May 1928, the recently formed Federal Radio Commission announced it would soon end the licensing of portable facilities, and the stations were notified that they would be deleted if they didn't find permanent homes. Carrell decided to keep WBBZ permanently in Ponca City, while retaining full ownership.
 
WBBZ was a charter member of the Oklahoma Network when it was formed in 1937.

C. L. Carrell operated WBBZ until his death in 1933, after which his widow, Adelaide Lillian Carrell, took over as owner and station manager. She in turn made arrangements in 1948 to sell the station to the Ponca City Publishing Co., which was finalized early the next year.

On September 12, 2018, WBBZ changed formats from classic hits to adult contemporary, branded as "Sunny 1230", a format transferred from sister station KQSN 104.7 FM Ponca City, which switched to country.

On September 6, 2022, WBBZ changed formats from adult contemporary to news/talk.

References

External links

FCC History Cards for WBBZ (covering 1927-1980)

Mainstream adult contemporary radio stations in the United States
Radio stations established in 1928
µWBBZ (AM)